The Malaysia Pro League (MPL) was a professional basketball league founded by Malaysia Basketball Association (MABA). The league organized the Men's division, Women's division, and Development League.

History
In 2013, Malaysia National Basketball League ceased to operate. After four years of absence, MABA created a national level league called Malaysia Pro League.

In 2022, Malaysia Basketball Association announced the establishment of a new professional basketball league called Major Basketball League Malaysia, replacing Malaysia Pro League.

Teams

 Farmco TouchUp 
 NS Matrix
 Red Baron
 Westports Malaysia Dragons
  JD Unicorns
  Z-Braves

Defunct teams
 Penang Stallions
 PRG Eagles 
 Verve Club 
  Kings Pinas Asia

MPL women
 Hatchers Valkyrie
 KL Binapuri
 NS Matrix
 Red Baron
 Segamat BC
 Westports Malaysia Dragons

Results
Men

Women

See also
 Asean Basketball League 
 Filbasket
 National Basketball League
 Malaysia men's national basketball team
 Malaysia national under-19 basketball team
 Malaysia national under-17 basketball team
 Malaysia women's national basketball team
 Malaysia women's national under-19 basketball team
 Malaysia women's national under-17 basketball team
 FIBA Asia Champions Cup

References

League
2017 establishments in Malaysia
Sports leagues established in 2017